The Gondoliers; or, The King of Barataria is a Savoy Opera, with music by Arthur Sullivan and libretto by W. S. Gilbert.  It premiered at the Savoy Theatre on 7 December 1889 and ran for a very successful 554 performances (at that time the fifth longest-running piece of musical theatre in history), closing on 30 June 1891.  This was the twelfth comic opera collaboration of fourteen between Gilbert and Sullivan.

The story of the opera concerns the young bride of the heir to the throne of the fictional kingdom of Barataria who arrives in Venice to join her husband.  It turns out, however, that he cannot be identified, since he was entrusted to the care of a drunken gondolier who mixed up the prince with his own son.  To complicate matters, the King of Barataria has just been killed.  The two young gondoliers must now jointly rule the kingdom until the nurse of the prince can be brought in to determine which of them is the rightful king.  Moreover, when the young queen arrives to claim her husband, she finds that the two gondoliers have both recently married local girls.  A last complicating factor is that she, herself, is in love with another man.

The Gondoliers was Gilbert and Sullivan's last great success.  In this opera, Gilbert returns to the satire of class distinctions figuring in many of his earlier librettos.  The libretto also reflects Gilbert's fascination with the "Stock Company Act", highlighting the absurd convergence of natural persons and legal entities, which plays an even larger part in the next opera, Utopia Limited. As in several of their earlier operas, by setting the work comfortably far away from England, Gilbert was emboldened to direct sharper criticism at the nobility and the institution of the monarchy itself.

Background

Genesis of the opera

The Gondoliers was preceded by the most serious of the Gilbert and Sullivan collaborations, The Yeomen of the Guard. On 9 January 1889, three months into that opera's fourteen-month run, Sullivan informed the librettist that he "wanted to do some dramatic work on a larger musical scale", that he "wished to get rid of the strongly marked rhythm, and rhymed couplets, and have words that would have a chance of developing musical effects." Gilbert counselled strongly that the partnership should continue on its former course:

On 12 March, Sullivan responded, "I have lost the liking for writing comic opera, and entertain very grave doubts as to my power of doing it.... You say that in a serious opera, you must more or less sacrifice yourself. I say that this is just what I have been doing in all our joint pieces, and, what is more, must continue to do in comic opera to make it successful."

A series of increasingly acrimonious letters followed over the ensuing weeks, with Sullivan laying down new terms for the collaboration, and Gilbert insisting that he had always bent over backwards to comply with the composer's musical requirements. Gilbert tried to encourage his collaborator:

Gilbert offered a compromise that Sullivan ultimately accepted – that the composer would write a light opera for the Savoy, and a grand opera (Ivanhoe) for a new theatre that Carte was constructing for that purpose. Sullivan's acceptance came with the proviso that "we are thoroughly agreed upon the subject." Gilbert suggested an opera based on a theatrical company, which Sullivan rejected (though a version of it would be resurrected in 1896 as The Grand Duke), but he accepted an idea "connected with Venice and Venetian life, and this seemed to me to hold out great chances of bright colour and taking music. Can you not develop this with something we can both go into with warmth and enthusiasm and thus give me a subject in which (like The Mikado and Patience) we can both be interested....?"

Gilbert set to work on the new libretto by the early summer of 1889, and by the mid-summer Sullivan had started composing Act I. Gilbert provided Sullivan with alternative lyrics for many passages, allowing the composer to choose which ones he preferred. The long opening number (more than fifteen minutes of continuous music) was the librettist's idea, and it gave Sullivan the opportunity to establish the mood of the work through music.  The costumes were designed by Percy Anderson and sets were by Hawes Craven, with choreography by Willie Warde.

They worked all summer and autumn, with a successful opening on 7 December 1889.  Press accounts were almost entirely favourable, and the opera enjoyed a run longer than any of their other joint works except for H.M.S. Pinafore, Patience and The Mikado. Sullivan's old collaborator on Cox and Box (and the editor of Punch), F. C. Burnand, wrote, "Magnificento! ... I envy you and W.S.G. being able to place a piece like this on the stage in so complete a fashion."

Reaction of the press and public
Leslie Baily notes, "The bubbling, champagne-quality of the libretto brought out the gayest Sullivan, and the Italian setting called up a warm, southern response from his own ancestry. The Graphic (14 December 1889) pointed out that the music contains not only an English idiom but 'the composer has borrowed from France the stately gavotte, from Spain the Andalusian cachucha, from Italy the saltarello and the tarantella, and from Venice itself the Venetian barcarolle'."

Of Gilbert's contribution, the Illustrated London News reported, "Mr. W. S. Gilbert has returned to the Gilbert of the past, and everyone is delighted. He is himself again. The Gilbert of The Bab Ballads, the Gilbert of whimsical conceit, inoffensive cynicism, subtle satire, and playful paradox; the Gilbert who invented a school of his own, who in it was schoolmaster and pupil, who has never taught anybody but himself, and is never likely to have any imitator – this is the Gilbert the public want to see, and this is the Gilbert who on Saturday night was cheered till the audience was weary of cheering any more."

There was a command performance of The Gondoliers for Queen Victoria and the royal family at Windsor Castle on 6 March 1891, the first performance of a Gilbert and Sullivan opera to be so honoured and the first theatrical entertainment to take place at Windsor since the death of Prince Albert thirty years earlier.

The Carpet Quarrel

With the exception of their first opera, Richard D'Oyly Carte produced every Gilbert and Sullivan opera and had built the Savoy Theatre specifically for productions of their shows.  However, on several occasions during the 1880s the relationship among Gilbert, Sullivan and Carte had been strained.

In April 1890, during the run of The Gondoliers, Gilbert discovered that maintenance expenses for the theatre, including a new £500 carpet for the front lobby of the theatre, were being charged to the partnership instead of borne by Carte. Gilbert confronted Carte, but the producer refused to reconsider the accounts. Gilbert stormed out and wrote to Sullivan that "I left him with the remark that it was a mistake to kick down the ladder by which he had risen". Helen D'Oyly Carte wrote that Gilbert had addressed Carte "in a way that I should not have thought you would have used to an offending menial." As scholar Andrew Crowther has explained:

Things soon degraded, Gilbert lost his temper with his partners and brought a lawsuit against Carte. Sullivan supported Carte by making an affidavit erroneously stating that there were minor legal expenses outstanding from a battle Gilbert had in 1884 with Lillian Russell when, in fact, those expenses had already been paid. When Gilbert discovered this, he asked for a retraction of the affidavit; Sullivan refused. Gilbert felt betrayed. Sullivan felt that Gilbert was questioning his good faith, and Sullivan had other reasons to stay in Carte's good graces: Carte was building a new theatre, the Royal English Opera House (now the Palace Theatre), to produce Sullivan's only grand opera, Ivanhoe. After The Gondoliers closed in 1891, Gilbert withdrew the performance rights to his libretti, vowing to write no more operas for the Savoy.

Gilbert's aggressive, though successful, legal action had embittered Sullivan and Carte. But the partnership had been so profitable that Carte eventually sought to reunite the dramatist and composer. After many failed attempts by Carte and his wife, Gilbert and Sullivan reunited through the efforts of their music publisher, Tom Chappell. In 1893, they produced their penultimate collaboration, Utopia, Limited, but The Gondoliers would prove to be Gilbert and Sullivan's last big hit. Utopia was only a modest success, and their final collaboration, The Grand Duke, in 1896, was a failure. After that, the two never collaborated again.

Roles

The Duke of Plaza-Toro, A Grandee of Spain (comic baritone)
Luiz, his Attendant (lyric baritone or tenor)
Don Alhambra del Bolero, the Grand Inquisitor of Spain (bass-baritone)
Marco Palmieri, Venetian Gondolier (tenor)
Giuseppe Palmieri, Venetian Gondolier (baritone)
Antonio, Venetian Gondolier (baritone)
Francesco, Venetian Gondolier (tenor)
Giorgio, Venetian Gondolier (bass)
Annibale, Venetian Gondolier (speaking role/chorus)
The Duchess of Plaza-Toro (contralto)
Casilda, her Daughter (soprano)
Gianetta, Contadina (soprano)
Tessa, Contadina (mezzo-soprano)
Fiametta, Contadina (soprano)
Vittoria, Contadina (mezzo-soprano)
Giulia, Contadina (mezzo-soprano or soprano)
Inez, the King's foster-mother (contralto)
Chorus of Gondoliers and Contadine, Men-at-Arms, Heralds and Pages

Synopsis

Act I
The scene opens in Venice with 24 farm girls declaring their passionate love for a pair of gondoliers, Marco and Giuseppe Palmieri.  These two gondoliers are so gallant and peerless in their manly beauty that the maidens are waiting for them to select brides before they can consider other suitors.  A large group of merry gondoliers enter, saying that they adore the girls, but the ladies explain that the two brothers must choose first.  When the Palmieri brothers enter, the ladies present them with flowers.  The two gondoliers amiably offer to pick their brides in a game of blind man's buff.  They appear to be cheating by peeking out from under their blindfolds, however.  Eventually, from the crowd of maidens, Giuseppe picks Tessa, and Marco picks Gianetta – "Just the very girl I wanted!" (although the two then politely offer to switch girls).  All leave to go to church for the double wedding.

His Grace the Duke of Plaza Toro (Count Matadoro, Baron Picadoro), Her Grace the Duchess, their beautiful daughter Casilda, and their drummer, Luiz, now arrive in Venice from Spain.  They have come to meet Don Alhambra del Bolero, the Grand Inquisitor of Spain.  As Luiz goes to announce the Duke's presence, the Duke and Duchess tell their daughter a secret that they have kept for twenty years – when she was only six months old, she was married to the infant son and heir of the King of Barataria. She is indignant, since the union was conducted without her consent.  The infant prince was taken from his home by the Grand Inquisitor, after the king of Barataria became a Wesleyan Methodist "of the most bigoted and persecuting type", and taken to Venice.  The King of Barataria was recently killed in an insurrection, and the hidden prince is now king.  As the wife of the new king, Casilda is now the reigning queen of Barataria, and her parents have brought her to meet with the Grand Inquisitor to be introduced to her husband.  We soon discover, however that Casilda is secretly in love with Luiz. Left alone together, she tells him of her infant marriage, and they resign themselves to a life forever apart, with only their happy memories to comfort them.

When the Grand Inquisitor arrives, he explains that the prince was raised incognito by Baptisto Palmieri, a humble gondolier, who had a young son of his own about the same age.  The gondolier was a drunkard and eventually forgot which boy was his own son and which boy was the prince of Barataria.  The two boys (Marco and Giuseppe) grew up and now are both gondoliers themselves.  Fortunately, the nurse who took care of the infant prince (and who happens to be Luiz's mother), is now living in the mountains, married to "a highly respectable brigand".  Don Alhambra says that he has located her and that she will be able to reveal which of the two gondoliers is the lost prince.  If not, he says, "then the persuasive influence of the torture chamber will jog her memory."

In the next scene, the two gondoliers have married Tessa and Gianetta, and as they are extolling the virtues of marriage, Don Alhambra arrives and informs them that one of them is the King of Barataria, but no one knows which.  Despite being Republicans, the gondoliers and their new wives are delighted, and agree to go to Barataria at once, acting as one individual until the actual king is identified.  The Grand Inquisitor tells them, however, that ladies are not admitted until the actual king is identified, and then each couple can be reunited.  The Grand Inquisitor neglects to mention that the King is married to Casilda, fearing that it would cause the men to refuse to leave their new wives.  As the two wives are imagining what it will be like to be a queen, their friends enter, and Marco and Giuseppe announce their discovery and promise to reign in a Republican fashion.  They announce that in their kingdom, "All shall equal be" and will create new posts such as "the Lord High Coachman on the Box, the Lord High Vagabond in the Stocks".  All the men then set sail for Barataria, leaving their wives behind in Venice.

Act II
In Barataria, the gondolier-courtiers are all enjoying living under "a monarchy that's tempered with Republican equality".  Marco and Giuseppe have been doing all the work around the palace for the past three months – it is the privilege of royalty!  They are happy enough with this arrangement, except that they are worried about having to share a single portion of rations between the two of them, and they miss their wives.  Soon, however, all the ladies arrive, having risked the long sea voyage from Venice – they could no longer stand the separation. In delight, the reunited couples have a magnificent banquet and a dance (a cachucha).

The Grand Inquisitor arrives at the ball to find that the Republican gondoliers have promoted everyone to the nobility.  He explains that there must be a distinction between commoners and those of rank, warning that "when everyone is somebody, then no-one's anybody". He then breaks the news that one of the gondoliers had married Casilda when a baby and therefore is an unintentional bigamist. The gondoliers attempt to console their wives, who are distraught to discover that neither one will be queen, and that one married someone who is already married.

The Duke and Duchess of Plaza Toro soon arrive with the beautiful Casilda.  They are now dressed in style, and the Duke explains how he was applied for by the public under the Limited Liability Company Act, and how they now earn a very good living.  Appalled, however, at the lack of pomp and ceremony with which they were received, he attempts to educate the two monarchs in proper royal behaviour. After a lesson in etiquette, the two Palmieri brothers are left alone with Casilda. She agrees to be an obedient wife, but warns them that she is "over head and ears in love with someone else." Seizing this opportunity, the two men introduce their wives. The three ladies and two men sing a quintet about their unprecedented predicament.

Don Alhambra brings in the nurse who had tended the infant prince of Barataria twenty years ago. She reveals that when the Grand Inquisitor came to steal the prince, she had loyally hidden him away, and given Don Alhambra her own young son instead. Thus, the king is neither Marco nor Giuseppe, but her own son, Luiz. This resolves the romantic entanglements to everyone's satisfaction. Casilda finds that she is already married to the man she loves, Luiz. The two gondoliers surrender their crown to Luiz and, though a bit disappointed that neither will be a king, they can return happily to Venice with their wives. There is a final dance for the full company, reprising the gondoliers' Act I duet and the cachucha.

Musical numbers
Overture

Act I

1. "List and learn" (Tessa, Gianetta, Antonio, Marco, Giuseppe, and Chorus of Contadine and Gondoliers)
2. "From the sunny Spanish shore" (Duke, Duchess, Casilda, and Luiz)
3. "In enterprise of martial kind" (Duke with Duchess, Casilda, and Luiz)
4. "O rapture, when alone together" (Casilda and Luiz)
5. "There was a time" (Casilda and Luiz)
6. "I stole the prince" (Don Alhambra with Duke, Duchess, Casilda, and Luiz)
7. "But, bless my heart" (Casilda and Don Alhambra)
8. "Try we life-long" (Duke, Duchess, Casilda, Luiz, and Don Alhambra)
9. "Bridegroom and bride" (Chorus)
9a. "When a merry maiden marries" (Tessa)
10. "Kind sir, you cannot have the heart" (Gianetta)
10a. "Then one of us will be a Queen" (Marco, Giuseppe, Gianetta, and Tessa)

Act II
11. "Of happiness the very pith" (Marco, Giuseppe, and Chorus of Men)
12. "Rising early in the morning" (Giuseppe with Chorus)
13. "Take a pair of sparkling eyes" (Marco)
14. "Here we are at the risk of our lives" (Giuseppe, Tessa, Gianetta, Marco, and Chorus)
15. "Dance a cachucha" (Chorus and Dance)
16. "There lived a king" (Don Alhambra with Marco and Giuseppe)
17. "In a contemplative fashion" (Marco, Giuseppe, Gianetta, and Tessa)
18. "With ducal pomp" (Chorus of Men with Duke and Duchess)
19. "On the day when I was wedded" (Duchess)
20. "To help unhappy commoners" (Duke and Duchess)
21. "I am a courtier grave and serious" (Duke, Duchess, Casilda, Marco, and Giuseppe)
22. "Here is a case unprecedented" (Marco, Giuseppe, Casilda, Gianetta, Tessa, and Chorus)

Productions
The Gondoliers was immediately a hit in London, playing for 554 performances, the fourth longest of the series (after The Mikado, H.M.S. Pinafore and Patience).  It earned more money than any other Savoy opera in its original run. 20,000 copies of the published score were sold on publication, and over 70,000 copies of various arrangements were sold within a few days. D'Oyly Carte's "E" Company mounted the first provincial production on 19 February 1890 in Preston. From then on, it was never absent from the touring repertory until it was omitted from the final two seasons (September 1980–February 1982) before the closing of the D'Oyly Carte Opera Company. Percy Anderson refreshed his original costume designs in 1917, 1919 and 1928.

The opera fared less well in New York. It opened at the New Park Theatre on 7 January 1890 and was immediately panned. Gilbert "refused to indorse  the company sent to New York ... because he considered the company a 'scratch' one." Carte came to New York to investigate and closed the production on 13 February.  He brought in replacements for most of the cast, and remounted the production at Palmer's Theatre on 18 February. However, the damage was done, and the production ran for just 103 performances in total.  The New York press dubbed the opera "the gone-dollars." The first production on the European continent was given at the Theater an der Wien, Vienna (as Die Gondoliere) on 20 September 1890. In Australia, its first authorised performance was on 25 October 1890 at the Princess Theatre, Melbourne, produced by J. C. Williamson.

A new production, with new sets and costumes designed by Charles Ricketts, was prepared for the opening of the renovated Savoy Theatre on 21 October 1929. The critic Ernest Newman wrote: "It was a subtle stroke to open with The Gondoliers; there is a peculiar richness of blood in the music of this work that makes the new theatre and the new designs and dresses by Mr. Charles Ricketts particularly appropriate." The performance was conducted by Malcolm Sargent, and the theatre's only box was occupied by Lady Gilbert. Peter Goffin designed new touring sets in 1957, and another notable new production was staged by the company in 1958 at the Princes Theatre with sets and costumes by Goffin. In 1967, new costumes were designed by Luciana Arrighi, with new sets by John Stoddart.

The first non-D'Oyly Carte professional production in the United Kingdom was given by Scottish Opera on 12 December 1968, with Ian Wallace as the Duke. There was also a production by the New Sadler's Wells Opera in February 1984, with John Fryatt as the Duke and Donald Adams as Don Alhambra. A Mafia-themed adaptation of the opera, by John Doyle and Sarah Travis, was given at the Watermill Theatre and transferred to the Apollo Theatre in the West End in 2001.  The production utilised Doyle's signature conceit of the actors playing their own orchestra instruments.

The following table shows the history of the D'Oyly Carte productions in London and New York during Gilbert's lifetime:

Historical casting
The following tables show the casts of the principal early productions and D'Oyly Carte Opera Company touring repertory at various times through to the company's 1982 closure. The roles of Ottavio and the Drummer Boy were credited only in the original production. Notable casting substitutions are shown for the first New York production; otherwise, only first-night casts are shown.

Recordings
The 1927 Gondoliers is admired for its excellent cast.  The 1961 D'Oyly Carte recording is a good stereo recording and includes complete dialogue.  The 1957 Sargent/Glyndebourne and 1991 New D'Oyly Carte recordings are both musically well regarded.

More recent professional productions have been recorded on video by the International Gilbert and Sullivan Festival.

Selected recordings
1927 D'Oyly Carte – Conductor: Harry Norris
1950 D'Oyly Carte – New Promenade Orchestra, Conductor: Isidore Godfrey
1957 Sargent/Glyndebourne – Pro Arte Orchestra, Glyndebourne Festival Chorus, Conductor: Sir Malcolm Sargent
1961 D'Oyly Carte (with dialogue) – New Symphony Orchestra of London, Conductor: Isidore Godfrey
1972 G&S For All (video; abridged) – G&S Festival Chorus & Orchestra, Conductor: Peter Murray
1977 D'Oyly Carte (with dialogue) – Royal Philharmonic Orchestra, Conductor: Royston Nash
1982 Brent Walker Productions (video) – Ambrosian Opera Chorus, London Symphony Orchestra, Conductor: Alexander Faris; Stage Director: Peter Wood
1991 New D'Oyly Carte – Conductor: John Pryce-Jones

Notes

References
  Second edition, second impression.

External links

The Gondoliers at The Gilbert & Sullivan Archive
Vocal score at the IMSLP
The Gondoliers at The Gilbert & Sullivan Discography
Gilbert & Sullivan song parodies, including some from The Gondoliers
List of longest-running theatre pieces in London and New York
Biographies of the people listed in the historical casting chart
Programme from the original run
Photo of British prisoners performing The Gondoliers in Germany in 1917

1889 operas
English comic operas
English-language operas
Operas by Gilbert and Sullivan
Operas set in Venice
Operas set in fictional, mythological and folkloric settings
Operas